The traJ 5' UTR is a cis acting RNA element which is involved in regulating plasmid transfer in bacteria.

In conjugating bacteria the FinOP system regulates the transfer of F-like plasmids. The FinP gene encodes an antisense RNA product that is complementary to part of the 5' UTR of the traJ mRNA. The traJ gene encodes a protein required for transcription from the major transfer promoter, pY. The FinO protein is essential for effective repression, acting by binding to FinP and protecting it from RNase E degradation.

References

External links
 
 

Cis-regulatory RNA elements